The Thomas Gibbons Range is a building in Savannah, Georgia, United States. Now comprising eight properties, it is located on West Congress Street, in the southeastern civic block of Ellis Square in Savannah's City Market. Built in 1820, it is the oldest building on the square, and the oldest operating commercial building in Savannah. It is part of the Savannah Historic District, and was built, towards the end of his life, for Thomas Gibbons (1757–1826), a planter, politician, lawyer, steamboat owner and the plaintiff in Gibbons vs. Ogden. The building was erected by his son William. Gibbons had owned the lot since 1809.

In 1943, Frank C. Mathews purchased the property at number 116, where he established Mathews Seafood. The following year, he purchased the adjacent number 114, and a local signmaker was commissioned to make a neon fish sign for the restaurant now known as Sorry Charlie's Oyster Bar. The sign became a popular landmark, and the Historic Savannah Foundation designated it a historic artifact. (This is not the sign on the building today.) Sorry Charlie's expanded again, into 112 West Congress Street, in 2018.

The Lady & Sons, a restaurant owned by Paula Deen, has occupied number 102, at the Whitaker Street end of the building, since 1996.

Gallery

See also
Buildings in Savannah Historic District

References

Commercial buildings completed in 1820
Ellis Square (Savannah) buildings
Savannah Historic District